Armour of God is a 1986 Hong Kong action-comedy written and directed by Jackie Chan, who also starred in the film in the lead role. The film co-stars Alan Tam, Lola Forner and Rosamund Kwan.

The film combines Chan's martial arts, comedy and stunts with an Indiana Jones style adventure film theme and is deemed a cult classic. Chan came the closest he had ever been to death in this film during a relatively routine stunt; he leaped onto a tree from a ledge, but the branch he grabbed snapped, sending Chan plummeting and cracking his skull.

The film was the highest-grossing film in Hong Kong at the time, grossing an estimated  at the box office in Asia and Europe. It was followed by the sequel Armour of God II: Operation Condor in 1991. It also inspired several other action-adventure films starring Jackie Chan, including The Medallion (2003), The Myth (2005), CZ12 (2012) and Kung Fu Yoga (2017) as well as the cartoon series Jackie Chan Adventures.

Plot
Jackie, a.k.a. "Asian Hawk", is a former musician who becomes an adventurer and treasure hunter. After successfully stealing a sword from an African tribe, he has the weapon auctioned before it is won by May Bannon, the beautiful daughter of Count Bannon. He is reunited with his former bandmate Alan, who seeks his help as his girlfriend Lorelei has been kidnapped by an evil religious cult as a means of acquiring Jackie's services. The cult possesses two pieces of a legendary armour called the "Armour of God", and they intend to have Jackie bring them the three remaining armour pieces, including the sword. Jackie and Alan strike a deal with Count Bannon, who is in possession of the three armour pieces: they will borrow the armour pieces for their quest to rescue Lorelei with a promise to complete the armour for the Count, on the condition that May accompanies them.

Jackie, Alan and May travel into Yugoslavia to find the cult's monastery. They infiltrate the hideout and secretly rescue Lorelei, unaware that the cult leaders have anticipated their arrival and brainwashed her to do their bidding. At May's rest home, Lorelei drugs Alan and has him steal the three armour pieces. Jackie sneaks back to the monastery and rescues his friends. As Alan and Lorelei make their escape, Jackie fends off against the cult members before discovering the Armour of God in a cave. Before he gets a chance to take the armour, he encounters the Grand Wizard, who unleashes his four female assassins on the adventurer. Exploiting their high-heeled shoes as their weakness, Jackie defeats the assassins in a gruelling fight. Jackie is then surrounded by the rest of the Grand Wizard's men, but he reveals a vest filled with sticks of dynamite under his jacket, threatening to blow himself up with the monastery. After a couple of bluffs, he carelessly lights up the fuse and throws away the sticks of dynamite, running for his life as the monastery quickly begins to cave in, burying the entire cult and the Armour of God. He runs out of a cave and spots a hot-air balloon with Alan, Lorelei, and May aboard. In a daring move, Jackie does a base jump off the cave and lands on top of the balloon, ending the movie.

Cast
 Jackie Chan as Jackie a.k.a. "Asian Hawk", a common treasure hunter and former member of the pop group "The Losers" (an allusion to '70s Cantopop band The Wynners)
 Alan Tam as Alan, a former member of The Losers who has moved on to a successful solo career
 Lola Forner as May Bannon, the daughter of a powerful European Count
 Rosamund Kwan as Lorelei, Alan's girlfriend and a former member of the Losers who is a prominent fashion designer
 Božidar Smiljanić as Count Bannon, May's father
 Ken Boyle as Grand Wizard, the leader of the evil religious cult
 John Ladalski as Lama
 Robert O'Brien as the African witch doctor
 Boris Gregoric as Jackie's representative at the auction
 Mars (extra) (uncredited)
 Kenny Bee 
 Carina Lau 
 Anthony Chan

Production
Armour of God was filmed on location in parts of what was then Yugoslavia: Zagreb (Dolac Central Market), Upper town, Trnje (near the then-unfinished building of Croatian Radio Television), Croatia, and Predjama Castle near Postojna, Slovenia. Filming was also undertaken in Graz, Austria, France, Spain and Morocco. During filming of the opening sequence, one scene called for Jackie Chan to jump from a wall to a tree branch. The first take went as planned, but Chan insisted on re-shooting the scene. On his second attempt, the branch broke, and he fell 5 metres to the ground below. His head hit a rock, cracking his skull and forcing a piece of bone up into his brain. Chan was flown to the hospital and was in surgery eight hours later. As a result, he now has a permanent hole in his head filled with a plastic plug and slight hearing loss in his right ear. Chan replaced Eric Tsang as director following the accident. Footage of the accident is shown during the film's ending credits.

While shooting the hot-air balloon jump, Chan skydived out of a plane and landed on top of the balloon instead of jumping off a cliff as is seen in the film. For the shot of him jumping off the cliff, the crew rigged him up to a wire as he had no experience of BASE jumping.

Release
Armour of God was released in Japan in mid-1986, specifically on 16 August 1986. The film was released in Hong Kong on 21 January 1987.

Reception

Box office
In Hong Kong, the film grossed 35,469,408. It was the highest-grossing film in Hong Kong at the time. In Japan, the film grossed . In Taiwan, it grossed  (US$472,188). In South Korea, it was the top-grossing foreign film of 1987, with 208,462 ticket sales, equivalent to an estimated .

In Hungary, the film sold 464,200 tickets at the box office in 1988, equivalent to an estimated  in gross revenue. In France, it sold 88,231 tickets in 1988, equivalent to an estimated . Combined, the film grossed an estimated  in Asia and Europe.

Critical response
The film received positive reviews, with an approval rating of 70% on Rotten Tomatoes based on ten reviews.

In 2014, Time Out polled several film critics, directors, actors and stunt actors to list their top action films. Armour of God was listed at 81st place on this list.

Versions
In Asia, some versions of the film had Alan Tam's song "Lorelei" playing during the end credits whereas others had Jackie Chan singing "Flight of the Dragon (aka High upon High)". Tam and Chan recorded both songs in Cantonese and English and their English versions were featured in the export English dubs.

In the United States, Armour of God did not receive a theatrical release. The film's sequel, Armour of God II: Operation Condor (1991), was released under the simplified title Operation Condor. Armour of God was subsequently released direct-to-video by Miramax Films, but the title was changed to Operation Condor 2: The Armor of the Gods; at the time of its release it served as a prequel, despite being the first film. A new musical score was created for this release, and a new English dub (with the participation of Chan).

Nine minutes of cuts were made to the Miramax version, including:
 The concert scene of Jackie's band The Losers.
 Jackie's dream sequence.
 The scene in which May, disguised as a prostitute, encounters a monk who wants to sleep with her.
 An extended version of the slapstick sequence in which Alan hides in May's room. The scene also includes a brainwashed Lorelei attempting to seduce Jackie.

These same cuts were evident in the Spanish Region 2 release, but DVD releases in Hong Kong, Australia and the rest of Europe are uncut.

Awards and nominations
 1988 Hong Kong Film Awards
 Nomination: Best Action Choreography (Jackie Chan Stunt Team, Lau Kar-wing, Danny Yuen)

See also

 Jackie Chan filmography
 List of Hong Kong films
 Khiladi 420 (2000), Indian action film in which Akshay Kumar performs a similar hot-air balloon stunt

References

Bibliography

External links
 
 
 

1986 films
1986 martial arts films
1980s adventure comedy films
1980s action comedy films
1980s action adventure films
Hong Kong adventure comedy films
Hong Kong action comedy films
Hong Kong martial arts comedy films
1980s Cantonese-language films
Films about cults
Films directed by Jackie Chan
Films directed by Eric Tsang
Films scored by Michael Wandmacher
Films set in Africa
Films set in Paris
Films set in Yugoslavia
Films shot in Austria
Films shot in Croatia
Films shot in Morocco
Films shot in Paris
Films shot in Slovenia
Films shot in Spain
Films shot in Yugoslavia
Films shot in the Philippines
Golden Harvest films
Media Asia films
Films set in monasteries
1986 comedy films
1980s Hong Kong films